(David) Warren Arthur East  (born 27 October 1961) is the former chief executive officer (CEO) of Rolls-Royce Holdings, a leading UK-based engine manufacturer. He previously held senior positions at ARM Holdings and Texas Instruments.

Education
East attended Monmouth School and earned a bachelor's degree in engineering science from Wadham College, Oxford. He went on to earn a Master of Business Administration (MBA) degree from Cranfield School of Management at Cranfield University.

Career
After 11 years with the chip maker Texas Instruments, East left in 1994 to join ARM Holdings, the British fabless manufacturing microprocessor design and software company. At ARM he established the company's consulting business.

East later became VP of business operations at ARM. Within three years he was appointed to the board as chief operating officer. East was appointed CEO of ARM Holdings in October 2001. He moved on from ARM on 1 July 2013, and was succeeded by Simon Segars.

In 2014 East became a non-executive director of Rolls-Royce Holdings and chair of the board's technology committee. In April 2015 Rolls-Royce announced that East would succeed John Rishton as CEO, when Rishton retired on 2 July.  East led Rolls-Royce through a turbulent period involving the impact of the Covid-19 pandemic impact on Global Aviation, increased pressure to transition to Net-Zero, and in-service issues relating to the Trent 1000. After 7 years leading Rolls-Royce he retired from the company at the end of 2022.

In January 2020, Warren East was appointed to the board of ASML Holdings.

Honours and awards
East was appointed Commander of the Order of the British Empire (CBE) in the 2014 New Year Honours, for services to the technology industry. He was elected a Fellow of the Royal Academy of Engineering in 2007 and a Distinguished Fellow of the British Computer Society (DFBCS) in 2013. Also in 2013 he presented the Higginson Lecture in Durham University. In 2017 he became a Fellow of the Royal Society. He is a Companion (CCMI) of the Chartered Management Institute.

Personal life
Warren East is married and has three children, and lives in Cambridgeshire.

References

Living people
1961 births
People educated at Monmouth School for Boys
Alumni of Wadham College, Oxford
British chief executives
British corporate directors
Welsh mechanical engineers
Commanders of the Order of the British Empire
Fellows of the Royal Academy of Engineering
Rolls-Royce people
Arm Holdings people
Fellows of the Royal Society
Fellows of the British Computer Society